Chelsee Teresa Washington (born November 17, 1997) is an American professional soccer player who plays as a midfielder.

Early life 
Born in Dallas, Texas, Washington was a standout soccer player for Hebron High School and was named the Texas High School District 6-6A MVP Midfielder of the Year in both her junior and senior seasons. As a sophomore she helped guide Hebron to a 24-2-2 record and a 5A State championship. She played club soccer Solar Chelsea SC and the Dallas Texans SC, and was a six-year starter between the two club teams from 2011 to 2016 in the ECNL.

Bowling Green Falcons 
Washington played college soccer at Bowling Green State University. She was a four-year starter between 2016 and 2019 as the team won two regular season and two MAC Tournament titles. She earned multiple individual accolades during her tenure including Mid-American Conference Offensive Player of the Year in 2019 and All-MAC First Team selections in both 2018 and 2019. In 2019, Washington was named to the United Soccer Coaches All-Midwest Region First Team, becoming the second player in school history to earn all-region first-team accolades.

In the 2018 and 2019 offseasons, Washington played for WPSL club FC Dallas, making 14 appearances and scoring one goal.

Professional career

Orlando Pride 
Washington was selected in the fourth round (30th overall) of the 2020 NWSL College Draft by Orlando Pride. In doing so she became the first player in program history to be drafted. With the season disrupted by the COVID-19 pandemic, Washington originally signed a short-term contract with Orlando ahead of the 2020 NWSL Challenge Cup before the team was forced to withdraw. In September, Washington was signed through the 2021 season and made her debut on September 19, 2020, in the first Fall Series match, entering as an 87th minute substitute in a 0–0 draw with North Carolina Courage. She appeared in all four Fall Series matches for a combined 191 minutes.

On November 1, 2021, Washington joined Australian A-League Women team Canberra United on loan for the 2021–22 season having had her 2022 club option exercised by Orlando. She made 13 appearances and scored three goals, the joint second-most on the team.

Washington was released upon the expiry of her Orlando Pride contract in November 2022.

Career statistics

College

Club 
.

Honors

College
Bowling Green Falcons
Mid-American Conference Regular Season: 2018, 2019
Mid-American Conference Women's Soccer Tournament: 2018, 2019

Individual
Mid-American Conference Offensive Player of the Year: 2019

References

External links 
 Bowling Green Falcons profile
 

1997 births
Living people
American women's soccer players
Orlando Pride draft picks
Orlando Pride players
Canberra United FC players
National Women's Soccer League players
Soccer players from Texas
People from Carrollton, Texas
Women's association football midfielders
Bowling Green Falcons women's soccer players
African-American women's soccer players
21st-century African-American sportspeople
21st-century African-American women